Ciro Liguori (born 29 November 1969) is an Italian rower. He competed in the men's eight event at the 1992 Summer Olympics.

References

External links
 

1969 births
Living people
Italian male rowers
Olympic rowers of Italy
Rowers at the 1992 Summer Olympics
People from Salerno
Sportspeople from the Province of Salerno
20th-century Italian people